Kasu Pur Dulhar (کیسوپور ڈلہر) is a village in Sargodha District in the Punjab Province of Pakistan.

Its neighboring villages are Kohlian to the west, Turtipur to the south, and Sheikh Da lok to the east.
  
The main castes in villages are Gondal (Dulhar), Sial, Chohan, and Noul. People of the village are engaged in agriculture.

Masjid
There is one main masjid in village, Jamiya Masjid Kasupur Dulhar/.

School
There is one Government English Medium Primary School.

Common places (daras)

  Dara Ch Amir Gondal
  Dara Ch Zafar Iqbal Gondal
  Dara Afzal Sial
  Dara Haji Mazhar Sial

References

External Links 
Kasupur Dulhar on Bhera city website
Wikimapia 

Populated places in Sargodha District
Villages in Sargodha District